The following radio stations are located in and transmitted from Singapore.

FM stations
As of January 2023, there are 3 licensed broadcasters of terrestrial radio in Singapore, offering a total of 19 FM radio stations; 12 are owned by Mediacorp, 2 are owned by So Drama! Entertainment, and 5 are owned by SPH Media Trust. The radio stations are broadcast primarily in the four official languages -- Malay, Chinese, Tamil and English to cater to diverse audiences. Local listeners are also able to tune into BBC World Service, easily available 24/7 through long-term agreement with Mediacorp Radio, therefore, BBC World Service is also regarded as one of Mediacorp's radio channels since it is aired under its broadcast network. Besides tuning into local radio, residents are able to receive more than 30 foreign FM broadcasts from Malaysia (based in Johor Bharu) and Indonesia (based in Batam City/Tanjungpinang) if the signal is strong enough. RDS transmissions are utilized by all stations.

Listeners who do not have an FM tuner can listen to web streams of all FM stations by either visiting the stations' websites on a desktop or downloading the stations' respective apps on a mobile device. There might be a delay of up to 90 seconds compared to the live FM transmission.The radio stations utilised RCS Master Control broadcast automation software. An upgrade to the newer RCS Zetta was rolled out across all Mediacorp stations from August to November 2014.

Internet stations

History and listenership

References

Broadcasting in Singapore
 
 
Singapore